Sainte-Fauste is a commune in the Indre department in central France.

Population

See also
Communes of the Indre department

References

Communes of Indre